Secret Square was an early, now-defunct side project of The Apples in Stereo drummer and vocalist Hilarie Sidney and Lisa Janssen, who played bass on the Neutral Milk Hotel album On Avery Island. They had two 1995 releases, both self-titled, under the Elephant Six banner.

Discography
Secret Square (7" vinyl single) (1995)
Secret Square (LP) (1995)

External links
Secret Square at Elephant6.com.
Optical Atlas
[ Secret Square] at AllMusic.

The Elephant 6 Recording Company artists